Kirstie Mary Allsopp (born 31 August 1971) is a British television presenter, best known as co-presenter of Channel 4 property shows including Location, Location, Location, Love It or List It UK, Relocation, Relocation and Location Revisited.

Background 

Allsopp is the daughter of Charles Allsopp, 6th Baron Hindlip, a former chairman of Christie's, by his marriage to Fiona Victoria Jean Atherley McGowan (1947–2014). She has a younger brother, Henry, and two younger sisters, Sofie and Natasha. Owing to her father's peerage, she is entitled to use the courtesy style The Honourable Kirstie Allsopp. The designer and businesswoman Cath Kidston is her cousin.

She attended ten schools as a child, including St Clotilde's in Lechlade, Gloucestershire, and Bedales near Petersfield, Hampshire. After spending time in India teaching English, Allsopp returned to the UK and began a series of positions, working for Country Living and Food & Homes Magazine and her mother's business, Hindlip & Prentice Interiors, and studying at Christie's. Allsopp set up her own home search company, Kirmir, in 1996, focusing on top end purchases in Central and West London.

In August 2014, Allsopp was one of 200 public figures who were signatories to a letter to The Guardian opposing Scottish independence in the run-up to September's referendum on that issue.

Personal life
Her partner is property developer Ben Andersen, and they have two sons, born in 2006 and 2008. She is also stepmother to her partner's two children from a previous relationship. They live in London.

In 2009 they and family bought and restored a house called Meadowgate, in rural Devon. It had been empty for 39 years. The restoration and interior decorating were the subject of the TV series Kirstie's Homemade Home. It was again the setting for her Kirstie's Homemade Christmas programme, showing people how to have an individual Christmas using secondhand and homemade products such as wreaths from material found from nearby wood.

In 2014, Allsopp revealed to The Times that her mother, who died on 6 January aged 66 from breast cancer, had been buried, at her own request, in a wicker coffin, in the garden of her Dorset home.

In June 2022 Allsopp claimed to have accidentally swallowed an Apple AirPod while taking vitamins, she was able to regurgitate the AirPod without medical assistance.

References

External links
 
 Kirstie Allsopp's biography at Channel4.com

1971 births
British reporters and correspondents
Channel 4 people
Daughters of barons
English television journalists
English women journalists
English television presenters
British estate agents (people)
Living people
People educated at Bedales School
British women television journalists